Sebastian Ciobanu (born March 17, 1985) is a Romanian Super heavyweight kickboxer fighting in the K-1 and SUPERKOMBAT promotions.

Career

K-1
He made his K-1 debut in 2009 at K-1 World Grand Prix 2009 in Tokyo Final 16 Qualifying GP against Sergei Lascenko.

The biggest performance of his career came in 2010 when he became K-1 World Grand Prix in Bucharest runner-up, in a tournament where he defeated Mighty Mo by KO.

He next faced Dževad Poturak at the SuperKombat World Grand Prix 2012 IV on October 20, 2012 in Arad, Romania and defeated the Bosnian on points to earn himself a wild card spot for the SuperKombat Final Elimination on November 10.

He won a split decision over Roman Kleibl on November 10, 2012 in Craiova, Romania at the SuperKombat World Grand Prix 2012 Final Elimination, which is the quarter-finals of the SuperKombat World Grand Prix 2012.

He rematched Ismael Londt in the semi-finals at the SuperKombat World Grand Prix 2012 Final on December 22, 2012 in Bucharest and lost via technical knockout due to a cut in the second round.

He won the SuperKombat World Grand Prix 10 in Craiova, Romania on May 18, 2013. After a unanimous decision victory over Vladimir Toktasynov in the semi-finals, he took a controversial extension round unanimous decision win over Frank Muñoz in the final.

He rematched Redouan Cairo at SuperKombat World Grand Prix 2013 IV in Giurgiu, Romania on October 12, 2013 and found himself on the receiving end of a brutal knee KO in round three.

He defeated Enver Šljivar via unanimous decision at the SUPERKOMBAT World Grand Prix I 2014 in Reșița, Romania on April 12, 2014.

He fought to a draw with Jallon Corentin at SUPERKOMBAT World Grand Prix II 2014 in Mamaia, Romania on May 24, 2014.

Titles
 2013 Superkombat World Grand Prix II tournament champion
 2010 K-1 World Grand Prix in Bucharest tournament runner-up
 2009 K-1 Rules Tournament in Budapest tournament runner-up
 Local Kombat Special Prize (2010)
 Local Kombat 20 tournament champion

Kickboxing record

|-
| 2017-03-12
| Loss
| Cosmin Ionescu
|Superkombat World Grand Prix Elimination, Romania
| Decision
| 3 
| 3:00
|-
| 2016-10-01
| Win
| George Davies
|SUPERKOMBAT, Romania
| Decision
| 3 
| 3:00
|-
| 2016-07-02
| Loss  
| Yousri Belgaroui
|Respect World Series 2, London, England
| KO (high knee) 
| 1
| 
|-
| 2015-12-19
| Loss  
| Wang Chongyang 
|Kunlun Fight 35, Luoyang, China
| Decision (Unanimous) 
| 3 
| 
|-
|-
| 2015-11-16
| Loss  
| Muharrem Hasani
|Illyrian Fight night, Winterthur, Switzerland
| KO (punches) 
| 3 
| 
|-
| 2015-10-16
| Loss  
| Tarik Khbabez
|ACB KB 3: Grand Prix Final, Sibiu, Romania
| Decision (Unanimous) 
| 3 
| 3:00
|-
| 2015-09-26
| Loss  
| Julius Mocka
|KOK World GP 2015 - Heavyweight Tournament, Quarter Finals, Chisinau, Moldova
| Decision (Split) 
| 3 
| 3:00
|-
| 2015-06-19
| Loss  
| Fabio Kwasi
| SUPERKOMBAT World Grand Prix III 2015, Constanța, Romania
| Decision  
| 3 
| 3:00
|-
| 2015-04-17
| Loss  
| Gökhan Saki
|GFC Fight Series 3, Dubai, UAE
| Decision (Unanimous)
| 3 
| 3:00
|-
| 2015-04-04
| Loss
| Maxim Bolotov
|KOK  World GP 2015 Chisinau, Chișinău, Moldova
| Decision (Unanimous)
| 3 
| 3:00
|-
| 2014-10-31
|  Loss
| Vladimir Mineev
|New Stream, Moscow, Russia
| TKO (Punches)
| 2
| 
|-
| 2014-08-02
| Win
| Nikolaj Falin
|SUPERKOMBAT New Heroes 8, Constanța, Romania
| Decision (Unanimous)
| 3 
| 3:00
|-
| 2014-05-24
|  style="background: #c5d2ea" |Draw
| Corentin Jallon
|SUPERKOMBAT World Grand Prix II 2014, Mamaia, Romania
| Draw
| 3 
| 3:00
|-
| 2014-04-12
| Win
| Enver Šljivar
|SUPERKOMBAT World Grand Prix I 2014, Reșița, Romania
| Decision (Unanimous)
| 3 
| 3:00
|-
| 2013-10-12
| Loss
|  Redouan Cairo
|SUPERCOMBAT World Grand Prix IV 2013, Giurgiu, Romania
| KO (Knee)
| 3
| 
|-
| 2013-06-14
| Loss
| Tomáš Hron
|Time of Gladiators, Brno, Czech Republic
| Decision (Unanimous)
| 3
| 3:00
|-
! style=background:white colspan=9 |
|-
| 2013-05-18
| Win
| Frank Muñoz
|SUPERCOMBAT World Grand Prix II 2013, Final, Craiova, Romania
| Ext. R Decision (Unanimous)
| 4
| 3:00
|-
! style=background:white colspan=9 |
|-
| 2013-05-18
| Win
| Vladimir Toktasynov 
|SUPERCOMBAT World Grand Prix II 2013, Semi Finals, Craiova, Romania
| Decision (Unanimous) 
| 3
| 3:00
|-
| 2012-12-22
| Loss
| Ismael Londt
|SUPERCOMBAT World Grand Prix 2012 Final, Semi Finals, Bucharest, Romania
| TKO (Cut)
| 2
| 
|-
| 2012-11-10
| Win
| Roman Kleibl
|SUPERCOMBAT World Grand Prix 2012 Final Elimination, Quarter Finals, Craiova, Romania
| Decision (Split)
| 3
| 3:00
|-
| 2012-10-20
| Win
| Dževad Poturak
|SuperKombat World Grand Prix IV 2012, Arad, Romania
| Decision (Unanimous)
| 3
| 3:00
|-
| 2012-05-12
| Win
|   Redouan Cairo
| SuperKombat World Grand Prix II 2012, Cluj Napoca, Romania
| TKO
| 2
| 0:12
|-
| 2011-10-15
| Win
|   Ali Cenik 
| SUPERCOMBAT World Grand Prix IV 2011, Piatra Neamț, Romania
| Decision (Split)
| 3
| 3:00
|-
| 2011-07-16
| Loss
|   Ismael Londt 
| SUPERCOMBAT World Grand Prix II 2011 Semi Finals, Constanța, Romania
| KO (Left hook)
| 3
| 0:37
|-
|  2011-05-21
| Win
|   Ratislav Talarovic
| SUPERCOMBAT World Grand Prix I 2011, Bucharest, Romania
| Decision (Unanimous)
| 3
| 3:00
|-
|  2011-03-18
| Loss
|   Freddy Kemayo 
| SUPERCOMBAT: The Pilot Show, Râmnicu Vâlcea, Romania
| Ext. R Decision (Unanimous)
| 4
| 3:00
|-
|  2010-11-20
| Win
|  Petar Valkov
| Local Kombat "10 ani in ring", Sibiu, Romania
| Decision
| 3
| 3:00
|-
|  2010-10-29
| Loss
|   Erhan Deniz 
| Sarajevo Fight Night 2, Sarajevo, Bosnia and Herzegovina
| Decision (Unanimous)
| 3
| 3:00
|-
| | 2010-05-21
| Loss
|  Freddy Kemayo
| K-1 World Grand Prix 2010, Bucharest, Romania
| KO
| 3
| 2:46
|-
! style=background:white colspan=9 |
|-
| | 2010-05-21
| Win
|  Mighty Mo
| K-1 World Grand Prix 2010, Bucharest, Romania
| KO
| 1
| 2:24
|-
| | 2010-05-21
| Win
|  Daniil Sapljoshin
| K-1 World Grand Prix 2010, Bucharest, Romania
| KO
| 1
| 0:47
|-
| | 2009-12-12
| Loss
|  Mounier Zekhnini
| K-1 ColliZion 2009 Final Tournament, Prague, Czech Republic
| Decision (Unanimous)
| 3
| 3:00
|-
| 2009-08-11
| Loss
|  Sergei Lascenko
| K-1 World Grand Prix 2009 in Tokyo Final 16 Qualifying GP, Tokyo, Japan
| Decision (Unanimous)
| 3
| 3:00
|-
| 2009-07-03
| Win
|  Matias Baric
| K-1 ColliZion 2009 Sarajevo, Sarajevo, Bosnia and Herzegovina
| Ext. R Decision (Unanimous)
| 4
| 3:00
|-
| 2009-05-16
| Win
|  Petr Vondracek
| K-1 ColliZion 2009 Mladá Boleslav, Mladá Boleslav, Czech Republic
| Decision (Unanimous)
| 3
| 3:00
|-
| 2009-04-12
| Win
|  Doug Viney
| Local Kombat 33, Romania
| Decision (Unanimous)
| 3
| 3:00
|-
| 2009-02-28
| Loss
|  Mladen Brestovac
| K-1 Rules Tournament 2009 in Budapest, Budapest, Hungary
| Ext. R Decision (Unanimous)
| 4
| 3:00
|-
! style=background:white colspan=9 |
|-
| 2009-02-28
| Win
|  Roman Kleibl
| K-1 Rules Tournament 2009 in Budapest, Budapest, Hungary
| Decision (Unanimous)
| 3
| 3:00
|-
| 2009-02-28
| Win
|  Dániel Török
| K-1 Rules Tournament 2009 in Budapest, Budapest, Hungary
| Decision (Unanimous)
| 3
| 3:00
|-
| 2008-12-12
| Win
|  Jaime Fletcher
| Local Kombat 32, Ploieşti, Romania
| Decision (Unanimous)
| 3
| 3:00
|-
| 2008-11-06
| Win
|  Petr Vondracek
| Local Kombat 31, Buzău, Romania
| Decision 
| 3
| 3:00
|-
| 2008-06-06
| Loss
|  Zabit Samedov
| Local Kombat 30, Timișoara, Romania
| Ext.R Decision
| 4
| 3:00
|-
| 2008-03-15
| Win
|  Dženan Poturak
| Local Kombat 29, Arad, Romania
| Decision 
| 3
| 3:00
|-
| 2007-12-14
| Win
|  Lionel Joseph
| Local Kombat 28, Brașov, Romania
| Decision 
| 3
| 3:00
|-
| 2007-06-15
| Win
|  Samir Dourid
| Local Kombat 26, Iaşi, Romania
| Decision 
| 3
| 3:00
|-
| 2006-12-16
| Win
|  Omar Benmahdi
| Local Kombat 24, Bucharest, Romania
| Ext. R Decision 
| 4
| 3:00
|-
| 2006-09-29
| Win
|  Roman Hurtik
| Local Kombat 22, Iaşi, Romania
| TKO 
| 3
| 
|-
| 2006-04-14
| Win
|  Alexandru Nedelcu
| Local Kombat 20, Râmnicu Vâlcea, Romania
| Decision
| 3
| 3:00
|-
! style=background:white colspan=9 |
|-
| 2006-04-14
| Win
|  Florin Ghiţă
| Local Kombat 20, Râmnicu Vâlcea, Romania
| Decision
| 3
| 3:00
|-
| 2006-03-10
| Win
|  Alexandru Nedelcu
| Local Kombat 19, Iaşi, Romania
| Decision
| 3
| 3:00
|-
| 2005-05-14
| Loss
|  Marius Tiţă
| Local Kombat 14, Bucharest, Romania
| Decision 
| 3
| 3:00
|-

See also 
List of male kickboxers
List of K-1 events

References

Sportspeople from Iași
1985 births
Living people
Romanian male kickboxers
Heavyweight kickboxers
Kunlun Fight kickboxers
SUPERKOMBAT kickboxers